Henk Vogels (born 19 June 1964) is a Dutch archer. He competed at the 1992 Summer Olympics and the 2000 Summer Olympics.

References

1964 births
Living people
Dutch male archers
Olympic archers of the Netherlands
Archers at the 1992 Summer Olympics
Archers at the 2000 Summer Olympics
Sportspeople from Eindhoven